The Other Side of the Bed a.k.a. The Wrong Side of the Bed is a 2002 Spanish musical comedy film directed by Emilio Martínez Lázaro and written by David Serrano, which stars Ernesto Alterio, Paz Vega, Guillermo Toledo and Natalia Verbeke alongside Alberto San Juan and María Esteve. A box-office hit, it became the highest-grossing Spanish film in the domestic market in 2002.

Plot
Sex, love, lies, bed-hopping and mistaken identities abound in this pop musical-comedy set in Madrid. The gorgeous Paula breaks up with her boyfriend Pedro in order to continue her affair with Javier. The immature Javier however, is unwilling to break up with his current girlfriend Sonia, or confess to their affair to Pedro, who happens to be his best friend.

Cast

Release 
The film screened at the Málaga Film Festival in 2002. It was theatrically released in Spain on 5 July 2002.

Sequel

The film was followed three years later by a sequel entitled The 2 Sides of the Bed. Martínez-Lázaro and Serrano return as director and screenwriter while Alterio, Toledo, San Juan, Esteve and de la Rosa all reprise their roles.

Remake

A French remake entitled  (On va s'aimer in French speaking markets) was released in 2006.

See also 
 List of Spanish films of 2002

References

External links
 
 

2002 comedy-drama films
2002 films
Films directed by Emilio Martínez Lázaro
Films shot in Madrid
Films scored by Roque Baños
Spanish comedy-drama films
2000s Spanish films